Unguisnenteria is a genus of mites in the family Nenteriidae.

Species
 Unguisnenteria gracilis (Hirschmann, 1985)     
 Unguisnenteria unguis (Hirschmann, 1985)

References

Mesostigmata
Acari genera